Clyde Consolidated Independent School District is a public school district based in Clyde, Texas (USA).

Located in Callahan County, portions of the district extend into Shackelford, Jones, and Taylor counties.

In 2009, the school district was rated "academically acceptable" by the Texas Education Agency.

In 2020 the school district failed to respond to concerns from citizens about sexual orientation discrimination in their schools.

Schools
Clyde High School (Grades 9-12)
Clyde Junior High (Grades 6-8)
Clyde Intermediate (Grades 3-5)
Clyde Elementary (Grades PK-2)

References

External links
Clyde Consolidated ISD

School districts in Callahan County, Texas
School districts in Shackelford County, Texas
School districts in Jones County, Texas
School districts in Taylor County, Texas
School districts in Abilene, Texas